Come Around is the third studio album by Australian vocalist Carla dal Forno, released 4 November 2022 by the artist's label Kallista Records. The album was announced 17 August alongside the release of the lead single and title track, which also came with a music video edited by Ludovic Sauvage which depicts dal Forno walking through a blurry, red landscape. The album explores themes of home, disorder and insomnia, and is the artist's first since her move to Castlemaine, Victoria, Australia where she recorded the album.

Style and reception 

 The Skinnys Joe Creely notes that Come Around sees dal Forno "hone in even further" on her two previous solo albums' "80s DIY synth-pop and post-punk" sound, with a "trademark dreamy haze" which "is certainly there in spades." The album "feels slighter" than its predecessor Look Up Sharp and "doesn't have the tonal or the sonic variety of that previous record" aside from the more uptempo "Mind You're On", instead seeing dal Forno's sound-world polished to perfection.

Narcs Robin Webb says dal Forno's "familiar austere sound reverberates in acres of space often anchored by a rhythmically intimate synth or guitar reminiscent of the Young Marble Giants or Julee Cruise". The title track "plays to an empty auditorium audience of one, inviting you to come closer but only if you dare to", and while the album feels cold, "if you accept her invitation, immerse yourself in the swathes of gossamer washes, you'll find yourself 'no longer tethered to the world outside.'" Floods Kyle Lemmon calls Come Around "a waxing and waning album that fits [dal Forno's] moonlit style" and "her best effort yet."

Year-end lists

Track listing

References 

2022 albums
Carla dal Forno albums
Synth-pop albums by Australian artists
Post-punk albums by Australian artists